Kerry Foley (born 13 November 1953) is a former Australian rules footballer who played with Collingwood in the Victorian Football League (VFL).

KERRY FOLEY From 1972 to 1977 played with VFL Club Collingwood ,11 Senior , 64 Reserves & 12 U 19  games , missing nearly 2 years injured , including 1976 Reserves winning Premiership
From 1978 to 1983 Kerry played 101 games with VFA club Prahran.
He played in the 1978 winning premiership team and represented the state on 3 occasions.
Although not winning , for six years Kerry was top 5 in the best & fairest count .
He was inducted as full back into the Prahran “Team of the Century “ in 2002

External links

References 

1953 births
Australian rules footballers from Victoria (Australia)
Collingwood Football Club players
Bundoora Football Club players
Living people